John Maude (17 March 1850 – 17 November 1934) was an English first-class cricketer and solicitor.

The son of Thomas James Maude, he was born at York in March 1850. He was educated at Eton College, where he was tutored by George Yonge. From Eton, he went up to Lincoln College, Oxford. He played first-class cricket while studying at Oxford in 1873, making his debut for the Marylebone Cricket Club (MCC) against Oxford University at Oxford. He followed this up by playing four first-class matches for Oxford University, including in The University Match at Lord's against Cambridge University where he took figures of 6 for 39 in the Cambridge second-innings. In five first-class matches, Maude took 23 wickets at an average of 11.08 and twice took five wickets in an innings. 

After graduating from Oxford, he became a solicitor. He was articled to the law firm Rickards & Walker at Lincoln's Inn Fields, becoming a partner in 1877. Maude died at in Switzerland at Oberhofen in November 1934.

References

External links

1850 births
1934 deaths
Cricketers from York
People educated at Eton College
Alumni of Lincoln College, Oxford
English cricketers
Marylebone Cricket Club cricketers
Oxford University cricketers
English solicitors